Gerald Robertson (born January 2, 1962) is an American former professional stock car racing driver. He competed part-time in NASCAR from 1996 to 2006 (as well as one ARCA race in 1987). He primarily drove for underfunded teams in the Cup, Xfinity and Truck Series as well as in NASCAR's Southwest and Midwest Series, winning twice in the Southwest Series. He is notable for being the first ever driver for Furniture Row Racing, a team based out of Denver (also where Robertson is from) that would go on to win multiple races in the NASCAR Cup Series and the 2017 NASCAR Cup Series championship after starting out as an underfunded team in the series.

Racing career

Early career
Robertson began his racing career as a high school senior at Colorado National Speedway and won eight races, garnering the Rookie of the Year title. Over the next 12 years, he was a fixture on the national dirt-track racing scene, winning 126 times. In 1994, he switched to paved racing, and was named Rookie of the Year and champion in the NASCAR Grand American Modified Division. After being named "Oval Track Driver of the Year", he ran in the NASCAR Northwest Regional Championship Series, winning titles in 2003 and 2004.

NASCAR
Robertson ran eight races in the Craftsman Truck Series between 1996 and 2001.

In 2005, he joined the upstart Furniture Row Racing team and ran ten races in their No. 78 car. Robertson's best race finish came that year when he finished 22nd in the Ameriquest 300 at Auto Club Speedway. He also made his Nextel Cup Series debut that year for Furniture Row at Phoenix, finishing 41st after suffering an engine failure. Robertson was expected to run more Cup races for Furniture Row in 2006. However, without a guarantee of qualifying for races, the inexperienced Robertson was scaled back to run mostly Busch Series races for the team, which were his last NASCAR starts, while Cup Series veteran driver Kenny Wallace drove the team's Cup car. 

Although Robertson did not find a NASCAR ride for the 2007 and 2008 seasons, he continued to race locally.

Motorsports career results

NASCAR
(key) (Bold – Pole position awarded by qualifying time. Italics – Pole position earned by points standings or practice time. * – Most laps led.)

Nextel Cup Series

Busch Series

Craftsman Truck Series

ARCA Permatex SuperCar Series
(key) (Bold – Pole position awarded by qualifying time. Italics – Pole position earned by points standings or practice time. * – Most laps led.)

References

External links
  Dead link
 

1962 births
Living people
NASCAR drivers
American Speed Association drivers
Racing drivers from Denver
ARCA Menards Series drivers